Deportee is a 1976 dramatic short film written, produced and directed by Sharron Miller.  It stars Andrew Stevens, Leslie Paxton, and Sam Gilman.

Plot
Deportee tells the story of a young man and his alcoholic father who live in a skid-row hotel while trying to make ends meet.  The father longs for the farm they left behind when they came to the city seeking a better life.  The young man falls in love with a beautiful but troubled older woman who lives down the hall.  Their bittersweet romance proves to be his painful rite-of-passage into adulthood.

External links
 

1976 films
1976 drama films
American independent films
Films shot in Los Angeles
American drama short films
1976 independent films
1970s English-language films
Films directed by Sharron Miller
1970s American films